Ksenia Igorevna Kurach (born 1 April 1997) is a Russian sprint canoeist.

She participated at the 2018 ICF Canoe Sprint World Championships. She won the gold medal at the first ever C-1 500 m women's event.

References

1997 births
Living people
Russian female canoeists
ICF Canoe Sprint World Championships medalists in Canadian
Canoeists at the 2019 European Games
European Games medalists in canoeing
European Games bronze medalists for Russia
21st-century Russian women